Joseph Stalin started his career as a student radical, becoming an influential member and eventually the leader of the Bolshevik faction of the Russian Social Democratic Labour Party. He served as the General Secretary of the Central Committee of the Communist Party of the Soviet Union from 1922 until his death in 1953.

Joseph Stalin born Ioseb Besarionis dze Jughashvili began his political activity after being exposed to Marxism and other left-wing political thinkers while studying at the Tbilisi Theological Seminary in Georgia. After being discovered to be in possession of radical political literature, Stalin was expelled from the seminary in 1899. Following his expulsion, he devoted himself to his revolutionary activities and became a member of the anti-Tsarist, Russian Social Democratic Labor Party (RSDLP). When the RSDLP divided into the Bolshevik and Menshevik factions, Stalin joined the Bolsheviks lead by Vladimir Lenin, whom he finally met in 1905. Tasked with raising money for the Bolsheviks, Stalin resorted to criminal activity, through his formation of the Outfit, a criminal gang that were involved with armed robberies, racketeering, assassinations, arms procurement and child couriering. According to Montefiore, Stalin socialised with hitmen “Kamo and Tsintsadze" but issued formal commands to the rest of the Outfit members through his bodyguard. Stalin also took a leading role in the planning and execution of the 1907 Tiflis bank robbery.

Following the October Revolution, Stalin was appointed leader of the People's Commissariat of Nationalities. In addition to this position, he took military positions in the Russian Civil War and the Polish-Soviet War. Stalin was one of the Bolsheviks' chief operatives in the Caucasus and grew closer to Lenin, who saw him as a tough character, and a loyal follower capable of getting things done behind the scenes. Stalin played a decisive role in engineering the 1921 Red Army invasion of Georgia, adopting a hardline approach to opposition. His successes in Georgia propelled him into the ranks of the Politburo in late 1921.

At the 11th Congress of the Russian Communist Party (Bolsheviks) in 1922, the leaders decided to expand the party's Central Committee. This decision lead to the creation of the office of the General Secretary which Stalin assumed on 3 April. After a brief disappointment of not being given a prestigious ministerial post, Stalin soon learned how to use his new office in order to gain advantages over other key persons within the Communist Party. He prepared the agenda for the Politburo meetings, directing the course of meetings. As General Secretary, he appointed new local party leaders, establishing a patronage network of people loyal to him.

In 1922, Lenin's health was rapidly deteriorating alongside his relationship with Stalin. From late 1922 to early 1923 Lenin wrote a pamphlet, urging the party to remove Stalin as General Secretary fearing his authoritarian tendencies. Posthumously referred to as "Lenin's Testament", Lenin strongly criticizes other major figures including Leon Trotsky, Nikolai Bukharin, and Felix Dzerzhinsky.  When Lenin died in January 1924, the party was thrown into a state of chaos and a vicious power struggle began. Stalin, through his office as General Secretary, received advanced knowledge about Lenin's Testament and sought to delay its release. Upon the pamphlet's release to the party, Stalin offered a resignation from the position of General Secretary but his offer was rebuked by the greater party which desired to maintain the image of party unity. With his position secure, Stalin began to focus on consolidating his power and leveraging antagonisms among the Bolshevik Party's leaders. Many were members of the Party's supreme organ, the Politburo, but rivalries extended beyond that. Several People's Commissars (or Ministers in other countries) were involved in the Party's internal personal as well as political struggles. The main factions within the party was the intellectual "left wing", composing Grigory Zinoviev and Lev Kamenev. Opposing them was the trade unionist "right wing" faction of the party consisting of Nikolai Bukharin, Mikhail Tomsky and Alexei Rykov. Leon Trotsky led a group of his own supporters. In this environment of party polarization, Stalin painted himself as a moderate labeling his faction "the centre" while quietly building alliances with both sides through the mid-1920s.

Stalin then pivoted to focus on his greatest concern, the rise of Trotsky. Stalin forged an alliance with fellow Old Bolsheviks Grigory Zinoviev and Lev Kamenev to oppose Trotsky in the party apparatus. Defeating Trotsky was a difficult task as he had a public and prominent role in the October Revolution. Furthermore, Trotsky developed the Red Army and had played an indispensable role during the Russian Civil War. Zinoviev and Kamenev publicly feuded with Trotsky while Stalin did so quietly, in an attempt to appear as "The Golden Centre Man". Stalin's hostility towards Trotsky was political and personal. Prior to the revolution, Trotsky frequently snubbed Stalin, mocked his lack of formal education, and questioned his effectiveness as a revolutionary.  On the ideological front, Stalin's theory of  "Socialism in One Country" was a stark contrast to Trotsky's "Permanent Revolution". Stalin's ideology may have helped him attain power and accelerate Trotsky's downfall. The Soviet Union, having just come out of WWI and a bloody civil war was extremely war weary and exhausted. Permanent Revolution would have ordered the Soviet Union to organize military interventions against their non-communist neighbors. Whereas, Stalin's policies called for the government to focus on domestic development and securing the new Soviet regime.

By 1925, Trotsky's foreign policy was disgraced. All revolutionary movements in Germany and elsewhere had failed. Moreover, these attempted revolutions lead to an anti-communist atmosphere which fueled the rise of fascism in Western Europe. Trotsky's downfall was swift, he was first removed as Commissar for Military and Naval Affairs (January 1925), then removed from the Politburo (October 1926), and lost his seat on the Central Committee in October 1927. Stalin expelled him from the Communist Party in November 1927, and sent him to Alma–Ata in Kazakhstan in 1928. Trotsky was finally expelled from the Soviet Union in February 1929 and lived the rest of his life in exile.

With Trotsky removed from power, the alliance Stalin made with Zinoviev and Kamenev dissolved. Stalin then pivoted to form an alliance with the party's right wing forming a coalition with Bukharin, Tomsky, and Rykov, to weaken Zinoviev and Kamenev. Using his position as General Secretary, Stalin began to fill the Soviet bureaucracy with loyalists. After Lenin's death, Stalin began traveling across the USSR to deliver lectures on Leninist philosophy and began framing himself as the successor to Lenin.  As the 1920s progressed, Stalin used his position to expel critics within the Communist Party and tightened his grip on the party. Stalin's alliance with the party's right wing ended when Stalin decided to proceed with the First Five Year Plan, abandoning the New Economic Policy. Stalin finally defeated his opponents within the party by 1928, ending the internal power struggles. From 1929 onwards Stalin's leadership over the party and state was firmly established and he remained the undisputed leader of the USSR until his death.

Background

Before his 1913-1917 exile in Siberia, Stalin was one of the Bolshevik operatives in the Caucasus, organizing cells, spreading propaganda, and raising money through criminal activities. Stalin eventually earned a place in Lenin's inner circle and the highest echelons of the Bolshevik hierarchy. His pseudonym, Stalin, means "man of the steel hand". The October Revolution took place in the Russian capital of Petrograd on 7 November 1917 (O.S. 25 October 1917), which saw the transfer of all political power to the Soviets.

In the Russian Civil War that followed, Stalin forged connections with various Red Army generals and eventually acquired military powers of his own. He brutally suppressed counter-revolutionaries and bandits. After winning the civil war, the Bolsheviks moved to expand the revolution into Europe, starting with Poland, which was fighting the Red Army in Ukraine. As joint commander of an army in Ukraine and later in Poland itself, Stalin's actions in the war were later criticized by many, including Leon Trotsky.

Invasion of Georgia and General Secretary
In late 1920, with the crises in society following the Russian Civil War, Trotsky argued for the trade unions to be incorporated more and more into the workers' state, and for the workers' state to completely control the industrial sectors. Lenin's position was one where the trade unions were subordinate to the workers' state, but separate, with Lenin accusing Trotsky of "bureaucratically nagging the trade unions". Fearing a backlash from the trade unions, Lenin asked Stalin to build a support base in the Workers' and Peasants' Inspectorate (Rabkrin) against bureaucratism. Lenin's faction eventually prevailed at the Tenth Party Congress in March 1921. Frustrated by the squabbling factions within the Communist Party during what he saw as a time of crisis, Lenin convinced the Tenth Congress to pass a ban on any opposition to official Central Committee policy (the Ban on Factions, a law which Stalin would later exploit to expel his enemies).

Stalin played a decisive role in engineering the Red Army invasion of Georgia in February and March 1921, at a time when Georgia was the biggest Menshevik stronghold. Following the invasion, Stalin adopted particularly hardline, centralist policies towards Soviet Georgia, which included severe repression of opposition to the Bolsheviks, and to opposition within the local Communist Party (e.g., the Georgian Affair of 1922), not to mention any manifestations of anti-Sovietism (the August Uprising of 1924). It was in the Georgian affairs that Stalin first began to play his own hand. Lenin, however, disliked Stalin's policy towards Georgia, as he believed that all Soviet states should be on equal standing with Russia, rather than be absorbed and subordinated to Russia.

Grigory Zinoviev successfully had Stalin appointed to the post of General Secretary in March 1922, with Stalin officially starting in the post on 3 April 1922. Stalin still held his posts in the Orgburo, the Workers' and Peasants' Inspectorate and the Commissariat for Nationalities Affairs, though he agreed to delegate his workload to subordinates. With this power, he would steadily place his supporters in positions of authority.

Lenin's retirement and death

On 25 May 1922, Lenin suffered a stroke while recovering from surgery to remove a bullet lodged in his neck since a failed assassination attempt in August 1918. Severely debilitated, he went into semi-retirement and moved to his dacha in Gorki. After this, prominent Bolsheviks were concerned about who would take over if Lenin actually died. Lenin and Trotsky had more of a personal and theoretical relationship, while Lenin and Stalin had more of a political and apparatical relationship. Yet, Stalin visited Lenin often, acting as his intermediary with the outside world. During this time, the two quarrelled over economic policy and how to consolidate the Soviet republics. One day, Stalin verbally swore at Lenin's wife, Nadezhda Krupskaya, for breaching Politburo orders by helping Lenin communicate with Trotsky and others about politics; this greatly offended Lenin. As their relationship deteriorated, Lenin dictated increasingly disparaging notes on Stalin in what would become his testament. Lenin criticised Stalin's rude manners, excessive power, ambition and politics, and suggested that Stalin should be removed from the position of General Secretary. One of Lenin's secretaries showed Stalin the notes, whose contents shocked him. On 9 March 1923, Lenin suffered his most debilitating stroke, which ended his political career.

During Lenin's semi-retirement, Stalin forged a triumvirate alliance with Lev Kamenev and Grigory Zinoviev in May 1922, against Trotsky. These allies prevented Lenin's Testament from being revealed to the Twelfth Party Congress in April 1923.  Although Zinoviev and Kamenev were disconcerted by Stalin's power and some of his policies, they needed Stalin's help in opposing Trotsky's faction and to prevent Trotsky's possible succession to Lenin in a power struggle.

Lenin died on 21 January 1924. Stalin was given the honour of organizing his funeral. Upon Lenin's death, Stalin was officially hailed as his successor as the leader of the ruling Communist Party and of the Soviet Union itself. Against Lenin's wishes, he was given a lavish funeral and his body was embalmed and put on display.  Thanks to Kamenev and Zinoviev's influence, the Central Committee decided that Lenin's Testament should not be made public. At the Thirteenth Party Congress in May 1924, it was read out only to the heads of the provincial delegations. Trotsky did not want to appear divisive so soon after Lenin's death and did not seize the opportunity to demand Stalin's removal.

Downfall of Trotsky

In the months following Lenin's death, Stalin's disputes with Zinoviev and Kamenev intensified. While the triumvirate remained intact throughout 1924 and the early months of 1925, Zinoviev and Kamenev did not regard Stalin highly as a revolutionary theorist, and often disparaged him in private even as they had aided him publicly against Trotsky and the Left Opposition. For his part, Stalin was cautious about where the political situation was heading and often felt that Zinoviev's volatile rhetoric against Trotsky was going too far, especially when Zinoviev demanded Trotsky's expulsion from the Communist Party in January 1925. Stalin opposed Zinoviev's demand and skillfully played the role of a moderate. At this time, Stalin was allying himself more and more with Nikolai Bukharin and the Right Opposition, whom Stalin had promoted to the Politburo at the Thirteenth Party Congress. Stalin proposed the theory of Socialism in One Country in October 1924, which Bukharin soon elaborated upon to give it a theoretical justification. Zinoviev and Kamenev suddenly found themselves in a minority at the Fourteenth Party Conference in April 1925, over their belief that socialism could only be achieved internationally, which resulted in the triumvirate splitting up. This saw a strengthening of Stalin's alliance with Bukharin.

With Trotsky mostly sidelined with a persistent illness during 1925, Zinoviev and Kamenev then formed the New Opposition against Stalin. At the Fourteenth Party Congress in December 1925, Stalin openly attacked Kamenev and Zinoviev, revealing that they had asked for his aid in expelling Trotsky from the Communist Party. Stalin's revelation made Zinoviev, in particular, very unpopular with many inside the Communist Party. Trotsky remained silent throughout this Congress.

In early 1926, Zinoviev and Kamenev drew closer to Trotsky and the Left Opposition, forming an alliance that became known as the United Opposition. The United Opposition demanded, among other things, greater freedom of expression within the Communist Party and less bureaucracy. In October 1926, Stalin's supporters voted Trotsky out of the Politburo.

During the years of 1926 and 1927, Soviet policy toward the Chinese Revolution became the ideological line of demarcation between Stalin and the United Opposition. The Chinese Revolution began on 10 October 1911, resulting in the abdication of the Chinese Emperor, Puyi, on 12 February 1912. Sun Yat-sen established the Republic of China. In reality, however, the Republic controlled very little of the country. Much of China was divided between various regional warlords. The Republican government established a new "nationalist people's army and a national people's party" — the Kuomintang. In 1920, the Kuomintang opened relations with Soviet Russia. With Soviet help, the Republic of China built up the nationalist people's army. With the development of the nationalist army, a Northern Expedition was planned to smash the power of the warlords of the northern part of the country. This Northern Expedition became a point of contention over foreign policy by Stalin and Trotsky. Stalin tried to persuade the small Chinese Communist Party to merge with the Kuomintang (KMT) Nationalists to bring about a bourgeois revolution before attempting to bring about a Soviet-style working-class revolution.  Stalin believed that the KMT bourgeoisie, together with all patriotic national liberation forces in the country, would defeat the western imperialists in China.

Trotsky wanted the Communist Party to complete an orthodox proletarian revolution and have clear class independence from the KMT. Stalin funded the KMT during the expedition. Stalin countered Trotskyist criticism by making a secret speech in which he said that Chiang's right-wing Kuomintang were the only ones capable of defeating the imperialists, that Chiang Kai-shek had funding from the rich merchants, and that his forces were to be utilized until squeezed for all usefulness like a lemon before being discarded. However, Chiang quickly reversed the tables in the Shanghai massacre of April 1927 by massacring the Communist Party in Shanghai midway through the Northern Expedition.

While the catastrophic events in China completely vindicated Trotsky's criticism of Stalin's approach towards the Chinese Revolution, this paled insignificance compared to the demoralization that the Soviet masses felt at such a big setback for socialist revolution in China, with this demoralization aiding Stalin and his allies in the Communist Party and the Soviet state. Attacks against the United Opposition increased in volatility and ferocity. Many supporters of Kamenev and Zinoviev's group, as well as most from the Workers Opposition grouping, had left the United Opposition by mid-1927, changing sides under the growing political pressure and espousing their support for Stalin. Trotsky, Kamenev, and Zinoviev grew increasingly isolated and were ejected from the Central Committee in October 1927.

On 7 November 1927, on the tenth anniversary of the October Revolution, the United Opposition held a demonstration in Red Square, Moscow, along with Vladimir Lenin's widow, Nadezhda Krupskaya. On 12 November 1927, Trotsky and Zinoviev were expelled from the Communist Party itself, followed by Kamenev at the Fifteenth Party Congress in December 1927. At the Congress, where Kamenev acted as the United Opposition's spokesman due to Trotsky's and Zinoviev's expulsion, the United Opposition were unable to gain the support of more than a small minority of the Communist Party, and they were expelled after the Congress declared United Opposition views to be incompatible with Communist Party membership.

While Trotsky remained firm in his opposition to Stalin after his expulsion from the Communist Party and his subsequent exile, Zinoviev and Kamenev capitulated almost immediately and called on their supporters to follow suit. They wrote open letters acknowledging their mistakes and were readmitted to the Communist Party in June 1928, after a six-month cooling-off period. They never regained their Central Committee seats, but they were given mid-level positions within the Soviet bureaucracy. Kamenev and Zinoviev were courted by Bukharin at the beginning of his short and ill-fated struggle with Stalin in the summer of 1928. This activity was soon reported to Stalin and was later used against Bukharin as proof of his factionalism. Trotsky, firmer than ever in his opposition to Stalin, was exiled to Alma-ata in January 1928 and was exiled from the Soviet Union itself in February 1929, sent into exile in Turkey. From his exile, Trotsky continued to oppose Stalin, right up until Trotsky was assassinated in Mexico on Stalin's orders in August 1940.

Stalin turns on the Right

After the United Opposition was prohibited in December 1927, the Kulaks and NEPmen were emboldened and exerted much greater economic pressure on the Soviet government in the months afterwards. In January 1928, Stalin personally travelled to Siberia where he oversaw the seizure of grain stockpiles from kulak farmers. Many in the Communist Party supported the seizures, but Bukharin and Premier Rykov were outraged. Bukharin criticized Stalin's plans for rapid industrialization financed by kulak wealth, and advocated a return to Lenin's NEP. Bukharin was unable to rally sufficient support from the higher levels of the Communist Party to oppose Stalin. By the latter months of 1928, a critical shortfall in grain supplies prompted Stalin to push for collectivisation of agriculture. Stalin began pushing for more rapid industrialisation and central control of the economy, a position which alienated Bukharin and the Right Opposition, but which appeared close to what the Left Opposition had advocated before they were banned. Stalin accused Bukharin of factionalism and capitalist tendencies. The other Politburo members sided with Stalin, and labelled Bukharin a "Right Deviationist" from Marxist–Leninist principles. Bukharin was ejected from the Politburo in November 1929.

Stalin's agricultural policies were also criticized by fellow Politburo member Mikhail Kalinin. In the summer of 1930, Stalin exposed Kalinin's embezzlement of state funds, which he spent on a mistress. Kalinin begged forgiveness and effectively submitted himself to Stalin.  In September 1930, Stalin proposed dismissing Premier Rykov, who was Bukharin's fellow oppositionist. The other Politburo members agreed with Stalin, and supported his nomination of Vyacheslav Molotov. On December 19, the Central Committee dismissed Rykov and replaced him with Molotov.

After 1930, open criticism of Stalin within the Communist Party was virtually non-existent, though Stalin continued to hunt for discreet dissenters. Stalin dominated the Politburo (the policy-making branch of the Communist Party) through staunch allies such as Sergo Ordzhonikidze, Lazar Kaganovich, Vyacheslav Molotov, and Kliment Voroshilov.

Death of his wife

On the night of 9 November 1932, Stalin's wife, Nadezhda Alliluyeva, committed suicide and shot herself in her bedroom. As Stalin was sleeping in another room, her death was not discovered until the next morning. To prevent a scandal, Pravda reported the cause of death as appendicitis.  Stalin did not tell his children the truth, to prevent them from revealing it accidentally.

The Great Terror

On 1 December 1934, Sergei Kirov was murdered by Leonid Nikolaev. The death of this popular, high-profile politician shocked Russia, and Stalin used this murder to begin The Great Terror. Within hours of Kirov's death, Stalin declared Grigory Zinoviev and his supporters to be responsible for Kirov's murder. Lev Kamenev and Zinoviev were arrested and, to escape long prison sentences, confessed to political and moral responsibility for Kirov's murder. In January 1935, Zinoviev was sentenced to 10 years imprisonment, and Kamenev was sentenced to 5 years imprisonment. Stalin sanctioned the formation of troikas for the purpose of extrajudicial punishment. In April 1935, Kamenev's prison sentence was increased by another 5 years, to a total of 10 years imprisonment. Hundreds of oppositionists linked to Kamenev and Zinoviev were arrested and exiled to Siberia. In late 1935, Stalin reopened the case. Kamenev and Zinoviev were interrogated again, and the exiled Trotsky was now accused of being the leading mastermind in Kirov's murder. As in claimed by Montefiore, in July 1936, Stalin promised Kamenev and Zinoviev (through NKVD chief, Genrikh Yagoda) that there would be no executions or persecution of their families if they confessed to conspiring with Trotsky. Stalin's promise was soon broken. A few weeks later, after a trial, Kamenev and Zinoviev were both executed on 25 August 1936.

Spearheading Stalin's purges was a Commissar called Nikolai Yezhov, a fervent Stalinist and a believer in violent repression. Nikolai Yezhov continued to expand the lists of suspects to include all the old oppositionists as well as entire nationalities, such as the Poles.

Stalin distrusted the Soviet secret police – the NKVD – which was filled with Old Bolsheviks and ethnicities he distrusted, such as Poles, Jews and Latvians. In September 1936, Stalin fired the head of the NKVD, Genrikh Yagoda, and replaced him with the more aggressive and zealous Yezhov, with Yezhov overseeing the most brutally oppressive period of Stalin's Great Purge from late 1936 to late 1938.

In June 1937, The Case of the Trotskyist Anti-Soviet Military Organization took place. Marshal Mikhail Tukhachevsky and the senior Red Army military officers Iona Yakir, Ieronim Uborevich, Robert Eideman, August Kork, Vitovt Putna, Boris Feldman and Vitaly Primakov (as well as Yakov Gamarnik, who committed suicide before the investigations began) were accused of anti-Soviet conspiracy and sentenced to death; they were executed on the night of 11 to 12 June 1937, immediately after the verdict delivered by a Special Session (специальное судебное присутствие) of the Supreme Court of the USSR. The Tribunal was presided over by Vasili Ulrikh and included marshals Vasily Blyukher, Semyon Budyonny and Army Commanders Yakov Alksnis, Boris Shaposhnikov, Ivan Panfilovich Belov, Pavel Dybenko, and Nikolai Kashirin. Only Ulrikh, Budyonny and Shaposhnikov would survive the purges that followed. The Tukhachevsky trial triggered a massive subsequent purge of the Red Army. In September 1938, the People's Commissar for Defence, Voroshilov, reported that a total of 37,761 officers and commissars were dismissed from the army, 10,868 were arrested and 7,211 were condemned for anti-Soviet crimes.

Since his falling out with Stalin in 1928–1929, Bukharin had written an endless stream of letters of repentance and admiration to Stalin. However, Stalin knew that Bukharin's repentance was insincere, as in private Bukharin continued to criticize Stalin and seek out other opponents of Stalin (the NKVD wiretapped Bukharin's telephone). Shortly before their executions in August 1936, Kamenev and Zinoviev had denounced Bukharin as a traitor during their trial. At the December 1936 plenum of the Central Committee, Yezhov accused Bukharin and Alexei Rykov of treachery. Bukharin and Rykov confessed to conspiring against Stalin and were executed on 15 March 1938, on the same day that former NKVD chief, Yagoda, was also executed.

Stalin eventually turned on Yezhov. He appointed Yezhov Commissar of Water Transport in April 1938 (a similar demotion had happened to Yezhov's predecessor, Yagoda, shortly before he was fired). Stalin began ordering the executions of Yezhov's protégés in the NKVD. Politburo members also started to openly condemn the excesses of the NKVD under Yezhov's leadership, all of which gave the signal that Yezhov was falling from Stalin's favour. Yezhov eventually suffered a nervous breakdown and resigned as NKVD chief on 23 November 1938. Yezhov was replaced as NKVD chief by Lavrentiy Beria. Yezhov was executed on 4 February 1940.

Bibliography

Notes

Joseph Stalin
Rises to prominence by individual